Taleb Kanaan (Arabic: طالب كنعان) is a Lebanese senior anchor for Al Arabiya and the presenter of the monthly program Hewar Al-Arab (Dialogue of the Arabs).

Career
He started his career in National Broadcasting Network (Lebanon) NBN Lebanese news channel as an editor, following which he occupied several other positions in this network. Currently he is a news anchor at Al Arabiya TV news channel and he was the first news presenter appearing on the same channel in March 2003.
And a professor in CUD " Canadian University Dubai " .

Education
He earned in 2002 an MA in political science from the Lebanese University. He hold a PhD from University Of Wales, UK.

References

Living people
Lebanese journalists
Lebanese University alumni
Al Arabiya people
Lebanese expatriates in the United Arab Emirates
1972 births
Lebanese Shia Muslims